Ik ga naar Tahiti  is a 1992 Dutch film directed by Gerrard Verhage.

Cast
Hans Dagelet	... 	Hendrik Nicolaas Werkman
Peter Tuinman	... 	Schaap
Ids van der Krieken	... 	Capelle
Willem Becker	... 	Barnsteen
Eva van Heijningen	... 	Adrie
Esgo Heil	... 	Glaudé
Han Kerkhoffs	... 	Hansen
Bert Luppes	... 	Henkels
Peer Mascini	... 	Sandberg
Barbara Pouwels	... 	Dina
Els Ingeborg Smits	... 	Greet

External links 
 

Dutch television films
1992 films
1990s Dutch-language films
Dutch drama films